= Superior mine =

Graphite mine in British Columbia, Canada

- Interactive map of Superior mine
- Location: British Columbia, Canada; 49.44°N 117.46°W
- Products: Graphite

The Superior mine is one of the largest graphite mines in Canada and in the world. The mine is located in the west of the country in British Columbia. The mine has estimated reserves of 240 million tonnes of ore 9% graphite. The mine is no longer active as of october 2024.
